824 Anastasia is a main belt asteroid orbiting the Sun. It is approximately 34.14 km in diameter. It was discovered on March 25, 1916, by Grigory Neujmin at Simeiz Observatory in Russian Empire. It is named in memory of Anastasia Semenoff, an acquaintance of the discoverer.

Occultation

On April 6, 2010, 824 Anastasia had the distinction of causing the brightest asteroid occultation ever predicted for North America for an asteroid of its size.  The asteroid occulted the naked-eye star ζ Ophiuchi over a path stretching from the Los Angeles area to Edmonton, Alberta.

References

External links
 
 

000824
Discoveries by Grigory Neujmin
Named minor planets
000824
000824
000824
19160325